Torre Spaccata is an underground station of Line C of the Rome Metro. It is located at the intersection of the Via Casilina with Via di Torre Spaccata and Via di Tor Tre Teste. The stop serves the areas of Torre Spaccata, Alessandrino and Tor Tre Teste. Construction of the station started in 2007, and it was opened on 9 November 2014.

References

External links

Rome Metro Line C stations
Railway stations opened in 2014
2014 establishments in Italy
Rome Q. XXIV Don Bosco
Railway stations in Italy opened in the 21st century